Pedro Luis Capó Payeras (born 11 December 1990) is a Spanish footballer who plays for CE Sabadell FC as either a central defender or a central midfielder.

Club career
Born in Mahón, Menorca, Balearic Islands, Capó finished his formation with Penya Ciutadella. On 22 June 2009, he joined Segunda División B side CF Sporting Mahonés, and made his senior debut during the campaign.

Capó continued to appear in the third division in the following years, representing Celta de Vigo B, RCD Mallorca B, CD Atlético Baleares, Arroyo CP, CD Llosetense, SD Leioa and CE Sabadell FC. With the latter side he achieved promotion to Segunda División in 2020, and renewed his contract for a further year on 4 August of that year.

Capó made his professional debut at the age of 29 on 25 October 2020, starting in a 0–0 away draw against Real Zaragoza.

References

External links

1990 births
Living people
People from Mahón
Footballers from Menorca
Spanish footballers
Association football defenders
Association football midfielders
Segunda División players
Segunda División B players
Tercera División players
Celta de Vigo B players
RCD Mallorca B players
CD Atlético Baleares footballers
Arroyo CP players
CD Llosetense players
SD Leioa players
CE Sabadell FC footballers